Celia Margaret Wade-Brown  (born 12 July 1956) is a New Zealand politician who served as the 34th Mayor of Wellington, the capital city of New Zealand, from 2010 until 2016.

Wade-Brown was the third female mayor of the city, replacing centre-right Kerry Prendergast. She defeated Prendergast by 176 votes in the 2010 single transferable vote mayoral election. Wade-Brown won a second term in 2013. She was the second mayor of a major New Zealand city to have been a member of the Green Party, after Dunedin's Sukhi Turner, but she stood as an independent candidate. Wade-Brown did not contest the Wellington mayoralty in the 2016 local election for a third term.

Early life

Born in Paddington, West London, to a British military officer father Paul Wade-Brown, Wade-Brown grew up in a council flat. She attended The Holt School in Wokingham, Berkshire, England. After school, she took a gap year in Cape Coast, Ghana, then earned an honours degree in philosophy from the University of Nottingham. She started her professional life with IBM in the United Kingdom, and moved to Wellington in 1983.

As an adult, Wade-Brown discovered and connected with two half-sisters. One half-sister, Gitta Rupp, was an Austrian war child born to her father and an Austrian mother.

Political career

National politics 1996–2002
She has not appeared on the Green Party list since the  election.

Local government politics 1994–2010
Wade-Brown served as a Wellington City Councillor for the Southern ward in 1994–1998 and 2001–2010.

In 2010 Wade-Brown decided to run for Mayor of Wellington instead of standing again in her council seat in Wellington's Southern ward. Wade-Brown beat the incumbent mayor, Kerry Prendergast, by 176 votes. Some media outlets reported that this was the closest margin ever seen in the Wellington mayoral race. In total, Wade-Brown received 24,881 votes, compared to Prendergast's 24,705 votes.

Paul Eagle replaced Wade-Brown as a Councillor for the Southern ward.

Wade-Brown did not favour Wellington's adopting a 'super city' type council like Auckland, though she supported reducing the number of councils in greater Wellington from nine to "three or four".

Local government politics 2010–2016 
Wade-Brown was re-elected as Mayor of Wellington in October 2013, beating her main rival John Morrison 27,171 to 24,691 after five rounds of vote allocation.

Wade-Brown listed her priorities for the first 100 days as "the south coast cycle lanes, completing the draft annual plan before Christmas, agreeing on three-year priorities, taking first steps towards a living wage for council staff, slimming down council-owned companies and continuing to improve shared services with other councils".

In August 2014 Wade-Brown became an executive leader of Mayors for Peace. Peace Action Wellington criticised Wellington Venues' decision to host a 'War Conference' sponsored by Lockheed Martin in June 2015 because of her role as the executive leader of Mayors for Peace. A spokesperson for Peace Action Wellington said, "Her commitment to working for peace appears to be as shallow as her understanding of the role of weapons manufacturers in promoting war and militarism. In her response, the Mayor has equated the Weapons Conference with the likes of an international yoga meeting or a sustainable living expo."

Wade-Brown was criticised heavily for her involvement in the construction of a cycleway in the Wellington suburb of Island Bay. However, she increased the cycling budget from $70,000 p.a. when she was elected to $37 million over four years, including central government funding.

In 2016, the World Economic Forum recognised her as one of five ground-breaking female Mayors.

Under her leadership, Wellington maintained its rank as the 12th highest city for quality of life. In 2015, Vogue magazine described Wellington as the "coolest little city" and the BBC described Wellington as the "hottest little city".

Successful projects in partnership with central government included Pukeahu National Memorial Park, the Cenotaph precinct and WW100 commemorations. Other achievements included significant biodiversity increases with pest control and forest restoration. In 2013 Wellington became a Biophilic Cities partner.

Celia Wade-Brown was expected to run for reelection in 2016, but announced that she would not run for the mayoralty again. Justin Lester replaced Wade-Brown as Mayor of Wellington, winning the popular vote by more than 6000 votes over his rivals.

After a four-year hiatus from politics, Wade-Brown was selected as the Green Party's candidate for the Wairarapa general electorate seat at the 2020 election, campaigning to maximise the Green's party vote.

Community involvement
Wade-Brown was a founding member of the New Zealand Internet Society (now known as InternetNZ). InternetNZ is a non-profit organisation set up in 1995 dedicated to protecting and promoting the Internet in New Zealand. In 2002 Wade-Brown founded Living Streets Aotearoa, a walking-advocacy organisation with 15 branches. It holds collective membership of the International Federation of Pedestrians.

Wade-Brown is a Friend of Taputeranga Marine Reserve.

Family
Wade-Brown is married to Alastair Nicholson and has two sons.

References

External links

profile on the Wellington City Council website
celiaformayor.org.nz

|-

1956 births
Living people
People from Wellington City
Mayors of Wellington
Wellington City Councillors
Women mayors of places in New Zealand
Green Party of Aotearoa New Zealand politicians
People from the City of Westminster
English emigrants to New Zealand
Unsuccessful candidates in the 1996 New Zealand general election
Unsuccessful candidates in the 1999 New Zealand general election
Unsuccessful candidates in the 2002 New Zealand general election
Unsuccessful candidates in the 2020 New Zealand general election